Oakgrove is a village in Cheshire, England. It is part of the civil parish of Sutton and is situated on the Macclesfield Canal which is crossed here by a swing bridge and on the A523 road, just north of the boundary with Gawsworth civil parish.

References 

Villages in Cheshire